Hendrickse is a surname. Notable people with the surname include:

Allan Hendrickse (1927–2005), South African politician, Congregationalist minister, and teacher
Ralph Hendrickse (1926–2010), South African physician

See also
Hendricks (surname)